Joseph George (born 22 October 1977), better known as Joju George, is an Indian actor, playback singer and producer who primarily works in Malayalam cinema. He has acted in Malayalam films and worked on some Tamil projects as well.

In 2015, he won the Kerala State Film Award – Special Mention for his supporting roles in Oru Second Class Yathra and Lukka Chuppi. His film Joseph got special mention in 66th National Film Awards. He is a recipient of more than 20 awards, awarded for either his acting or production.

In 2015, he stepped into film production and produced films like Charlie and Udaharanam Sujatha before successfully launching his own production house Appu Pathu Pappu Production, which has produced several of his films.

Early life
Joju was born in Mala, Trichur on 22 October 1977 to George Parecattil and Rosy George. He did his schooling from GHS, Kuzhur. He then studied at the Christ College, Irinjalakuda before commencing his career in the film industry as a junior artist in 1995 and then as an assistant director in the year 1997

Film career
Joju began his career in 1995 with the film Mazhavilkoodaram as a junior artist. He gradually rose to stardom with supporting roles by the 2010s. In 2015, he won his first Kerala State Film Award (Special Mention) for his supporting roles in the movies Oru Second Class Yathra and Lukka Chuppi. His breakthrough in his career came with the leading role in the 2018 film Joseph, directed by M. Padmakumar, in which he played a retired police officer investigating a personal case while fighting demons of his own. The film received a special mention in the National Film Awards that year and Joju received his second Kerala State Film Award, this time for Best Character Actor for Joseph and the film Chola. Since then, he has done films like Porinju Mariam Jose, Halal Love Story, Jagame Thanthiram, Pada, and Aviyal. He had received praise for his work in the films Nayattu, Madhuram, and Freedom Fight for which he won Best Actor that year at the Kerala State Film Awards. By 2022, he has worked on over 100 films.

Joju's debut in the industry was with the 1995 film Mazhavilkoodaram as a junior artist, playing a character with the name Siby Jacob. Following this, he continued playing minor roles in movies like Independence (1999), Ravanaprabhu (2001), Pattalam (2003), Black (2004), Vaasthavam (2006), etc. Gradually, by the 2010s, he started doing supporting roles in many successful movies like Ordinary (2012), Thattathin Marayathu (2012), Pullipulikalum Aattinkuttiyum (2013), 1983 (2014), RajadhiRaja (2014), Action Hero Biju (2016), Njan Marykutty (2018), etc. and gained better recognition across audiences. He received his Kerala State Film Award – Special Mention for his supporting roles in the films Oru Second Class Yathra and Lukka Chuppi in 2015. It was in the year 2018, when he starred and produced Joseph, a critical and commercial success, in which he played the titular character. This role proved to be a breakthrough for him and he received garnering praise for his work and achieved even wider recognition. Along with his film Chola released in 2019, which participated in multiple film festivals, Joju received the Kerala State Film Award for Best Character Actor and the National Film Award – Special Mention for Joseph. After this, he played the lead in the film Porinju Mariam Jose (2019), directed by Joshiy, which was commercially successful. Post this, he has starred in many movies in the Malayalam film industry. In the year 2021, he had won The Golden Sparrow Award at the 3rd Diorama International Film Festival under the category 'Best Actor'- A Competitive Section for Indian Feature Films for the film Nayattu. This made him the first Keralite to win the award.

Apart from being an actor and a producer, Joju has also been credited as a playback singer for the songs Paadavarambathiloode from Joseph, Chandrakaladharane from Adrishyam and Kallatharam from Peace.

In 2021, he made his debut in Tamil film industry with the movie Jagame Thanthiram, directed by Karthik Subbaraj, a Netflix release, in which he played a supporting role alongside Dhanush. His second Tamil role came with the Tamil anthology series Putham Pudhu Kaalai Vidiyaadhaa, an Amazon Original, in the segment Mouname Paarvayaai. This launched him towards a more widespread audience. For his performances in the Malayalam films Madhuram, Freedom Fight, Thuramukham and Naayattu, he shared the 2021 Kerala State Film Award for best actor. He also received The Filmfare Award for Best Actor in a Supporting Role for his performance in Nayattu at the 67th Filmfare Awards South 2022, making it his second Filmfare Award.

As a producer, Joju has produced six movies which include Charlie (2015), Udaharanam Sujatha (2017), Joseph (2018), Chola (2019), Porinju Mariam Jose (2019), and Madhuram (2021). His official production house Appu Pathu Pappu was launched with Joseph and produced Chola and Porinju Mariam Jose, all with him as the lead.

Personal life
Joju married Abba in 2008, and has three children; Ian, Sarah and Ivan.

Filmography

Awards and nominations

References

External links

 
 
  https://timesofindia.indiatimes.com/entertainment/malayalam/movies/news/aishwarya-rajesh-joju-george-starrer-thriller-pulimada-starts-rolling/articleshow/88730130.cms
  https://www.thenewsminute.com/article/madhuram-review-joju-george-film-has-sweet-story-and-unforgettable-food-159121
  https://www.cinemaexpress.com/malayalam/review/2021/dec/26/madhuram-movie-reviewjoju-george-shruti-ramachandran-stand-out-in-a-bittersweet-love-story-28653.html

Living people
People from Thrissur district
Indian male film actors
Male actors in Malayalam cinema
1977 births
Malayalam film producers
Film producers from Thrissur
20th-century Indian male actors
21st-century Indian male actors
Special Mention (feature film) National Film Award winners
Male actors from Thrissur